Champvoisy is a commune in the Marne department in north-eastern France. It is a rural municipality, with a very low population density (27 /km2 in 2017). The municipality is part of the functional area of Reims, which is composed of 294 municipalities.

Geography

The primary land use of the municipality is agriculture. According to the CORINE Land Cover database, it is composed of arable land (54.1%), forests (22.3%), heterogeneous agricultural areas (9.3%), grasslands (8.6%), permanent crops (5.1%), industrial or commercial areas and communication network (0.6%).

History

Champvoisy depended on the custom of Vitry and the presidial of Château-Thierry, the first known lord, in 1172, was Thierry de Pierepont. It also came under the monks of Coincy, of the commandery of Passy which had a chapel there.

Demography

See also
Communes of the Marne department

References

Communes of Marne (department)